The Miserly Knight, Op. 24, also The Covetous Knight (Skupój rýtsar’), is a Russian opera in one act with music by Sergei Rachmaninoff, with the libretto based on Alexander Pushkin's drama of the same name. It contains roles for five male singers, but no females. The composer decided essentially to set the Pushkin text as written, and had Feodor Chaliapin in mind for the role of the Baron, however, Chaliapin withdrew from the production over artistic differences.

The first performance was on 24 January (11 January OS) 1906 at the Bolshoi Theatre, Moscow, with the composer himself conducting, in a double-bill performance with another Rachmaninoff opera written contemporaneously, Francesca da Rimini. The director was Vasiliy Shkafer.

Productions of the opera have been rare. In addition, the characterization of the moneylender, who is identified in the story as being Jewish, has been criticized as anti-Semitic.

Roles

Synopsis
Place: England
The Middle Ages

Scene 1
Albert is a young knight who devotes himself to jousting and courtly pleasures, but is now deeply in debt as a result. His father, a very wealthy but equally frugal baron, refuses to support his son's lifestyle. Albert's ability to maneuver in society is now limited, and he tries to obtain a loan from outside his family. A money-lender denies Albert a loan, but instead offers Albert poison, to allow Albert to murder his father. Albert is appalled at such a suggestion. He resolves then to go to the Duke to make his appeal.

Scene 2
The Baron descends to his cellars, exultant now because he has accumulated enough gold to fill his sixth and final storage chest, and gloats before them. However, he realizes that if he died soon, his son Albert could then claim the fortune and fritter it away on his sensual pleasures.

Scene 3
Albert has appealed to the Duke for help in obtaining money from his father. Albert hides, as the Duke summons the Baron to a meeting. The Duke asks the Baron to support his son, but the Baron accuses Albert of wanting to steal from him.  Albert then angrily reveals his presence and accuses his own father of lying. The Baron challenges Albert to a duel, and Albert accepts. The duke rebukes the father, and banishes the son from his court. However, stressed by this confrontation, the baron collapses fatally. As the Baron dies, his last request is not for his son, but the keys to his chests of gold.

Recordings
Audio
 Melodiya Records SRBL 4121 as The Covetous Knight: Lev Kuznetsov, Ivan Budrin. Moscow Radio Symphony Orchestra; Gennady Rozhdestvensky, conductor. 2 LPs, with Isle of the Dead, by the U.S.S.R. Symphony Orchestra with Yevgeny Svetlanov, conductor.  
 Deutsche Grammophon 453 454-2 (1997): Sergei Aleksashkin (The Baron), Sergei Larin (Albert); Vladimir Chernov (The Duke); Ian Caley (Jewish Moneylender); Anatoly Kotscherga (Servant); Gothenburg Symphony Orchestra with Neeme Järvi, conductor
 Chandos 10264: Mikhail Guzhov, Vsevolod Grivnov, Andrei Baturkin, Borislav Molchanov, Vitaly Efanov; Russian State Symphony Orchestra; Valeri Polyansky, conductor
 Russian Season"The Miserly knight" LDC 288 080 DDD (1994): Mikhail Krutikov (Svetlov) (The Baron), Andrey Chistyakov, conductor. Bolshoi Orchestra.
Video
 Opus Arte OA 0909: Sergei Leiferkus, Richard Berkeley-Steele, Maxim Mikhailov, Vyacheslav Voynarovsky, Albert Schagidullin, Matilda Leyser; London Philharmonic Orchestra; Vladimir Jurowski, conductor

References

External links
 Boosey & Hawkes page on The Miserly Knight

Operas by Sergei Rachmaninoff
Operas based on works by Aleksandr Pushkin
Russian-language operas
One-act operas
1906 operas
Operas set in England
Operas